Battle of Rostam and Esfandiyār is a story in Ferdowsi's Persian epic Shahnameh. It narrates a war between two Iranian governments. The difference from the other wars is that only the warlords are engaged in duels and the division is both observers. The reason for the war is Rostam's disobedience to Esfandiyār's father, Goshtāsp, the king of Iran.

Background
When Goshtāsp seized power in Iran, all countries were loyal except Zabol. Esfandiyar was commissioned to invade that country and capture Rostam, the leader of the Zabolians. Esfandiyar departed with a small number of troops and camped near a river near the city of Zabul. He sent his son Bahman to convey the message of the Shah of Iran to the leaders of Zabul. There was no profit in the chatter and the talks, and the duel between the two gladiators began.

This battle lasted for several days, sometimes Esfandiyar was victorious and sometimes Rostam was victorious but the outcome was not known; Rustam complained to Zāl of this difficult battle. Zāl took Simurgh help and Simurgh advised Rustam to win, but said the consequences of Esfandiyar murder would be severe.

Goshtasp's Palace
Esfandiyar was a senior commander for Goshtasp's strategic goals; he had previously won several major battles, but now had to kill Goshtasp's most powerful enemy and conquer he country. Esfandiyar had demanded a monarchy from his father, but Goshtasp's condition was to bring Rostam into captivity in the Iranian capital. Hearing the king's wishes, everyone was surprised; Esfandiyar's mother said it was a suicide. No one could fight Rostam, and the Shah must renounce his desire to conquer Zabol. Immediately after the king's ruling, Esfandiyar, along with his son Bahman and his adviser Pashootan, moved to the Zabol border and camped on the banks of the river, and then his Bahman were sent to Zabol with a message.

Battle

References

Sources
Ferdowsi Shahnameh. From the Moscow version. Mohammed Publishing.

External links

Shahnameh stories
Places in Shahnameh